Svogerslev is a small satellite town located four kilometres west of Roskilde, Denmark. The original village features a village pond, a Romanesque church, one of the smallest in Denmark, and a number of old farm buildings. The historic centre is surrounded by large developments of single family detached homes. As of 1 January 2022, it had a population of 4,267.

History
 
The name Svogerslev is mentioned in 1257 as Suauerslef, derived from the old male name Swawar and the suffix -lev. Svogerslev Inn opened some time during the 17th century. In 1727, it became a royal privileged coaching inn. The mail coach paused there to change horses on its way from Roskilde to Hornsherred. The inn was owned by the counts of Ledreborg. Count Holsteinborg closed the inn in 1808. In the 1970s, Svogerslev was expanded with large areas of single family detached homes.

Today
Svogerslev Church dates from the 12th century. The Romanesque nave was expanded with chancel, tower and porch in the Gothic style in about 1450. The church is one of the smallest in Denmark, seating just 60 people.
Svogerslev Inn occupies a set of thatched buildings dating to the late 1600s.  It reopened in the 1950s but closed again in July 2020.

The town has a Netto supermarket, a petrol station and a small shopping centre with a Meny, a bakery, a bar and a hairdresser. A small industrial area is located in the southeastern outskirts.

Surroundings
Svogerslev Lake is located to the southwest of the village. There are also several other smaller lakes in the area.

Notable people
 Martin Ågerup (born 1966), economist and president of CEPOS, lives in Svogerslev

References

External links

 Svogerslev Inn
 History
 Development plan for Svogerslev

Roskilde Municipality
Villages in Denmark
Cities and towns in Region Zealand